This is a list of members of the South Australian House of Assembly from 1915 to 1918, as elected at the 1915 state election:

 Alexandra Liberal MHA Alexander McDonald resigned on 17 May 1915. Liberal candidate Archibald Peake won the resulting by-election on 19 June.
 In the February 1917 Labor split, the official Labor Party expelled Premier Crawford Vaughan and his supporters, including a majority of their members of the House of Assembly, over their support for conscription in World War I. The expelled MPs formed the National Labor Party in March; the party was renamed the National Party in June.
 Newcastle Labor MHA Thomas Butterfield resigned on 21 March 1917. Liberal candidate Edward Twopeny won the resulting by-election on 12 May.
 Adelaide Labor MHA John Gunn resigned on 21 March 1917 to contest the 1917 federal election. Labor candidate Bert Edwards won the resulting by-election on 12 May.
 East Torrens Labor MHA Lionel Hill resigned on 21 March 1917 to contest the 1917 federal election. Liberal candidate Walter Hamilton won the resulting by-election on 21 May.
 Barossa Labor MHA Ephraim Coombe died on 5 April 1917. Liberal candidate Henry Crosby won the resulting by-election on 2 June.
 Sturt National MHA Thomas Ryan resigned on 16 November 1917 following his election to the Parliament of Victoria at the 1917 Victorian election. No by-election was held due to the proximity of the 1918 election.
 John Travers resigned from the Liberal Union in December 1917 and served out his term as an independent.
 Victoria MHA Clarence Goode resigned from the National Party in January 1918; he later clarified that he had only resigned from the parliamentary National Party. The coalition agreement between the National Party and Liberal Union for the 1921 election had only granted the National Party one seat for its two members, and Goode opted to retire to give Peter Reidy a clear run rather than recontest as an independent.
 Murray MHA Maurice Parish resigned from the National Party in January 1918 and sat as an independent for the remainder of his term.
 The three Liberal MHAs for Burra Burra, William Miller, Laurence O'Loughlin and John Pick, collectively defected to the Farmers and Settlers Association in February 1918.
 In March 1918, Sturt MHA Crawford Vaughan resigned as National Party leader, withdrew from preselection, and announced his intention to contest the 1918 election as an independent.

References

Members of South Australian parliaments by term
20th-century Australian politicians